

The SET XV was a fighter aircraft developed in Romania in the mid-1930s. It was a conventional single-bay biplane with staggered wings of unequal span braced by N-struts. It was fitted with fixed tailwheel undercarriage with spatted mainwheels. The cockpit was fully enclosed, and the engine was fitted with a NACA cowl. Construction throughout was fabric-covered metal.

The SET XV was developed to compete for a Romanian Air Force contract for a new fighter. However, before evaluation had even seriously begun, the Polish PZL P.11 was already selected as the winner amidst various claims of impropriety. The sole SET XV prototype was purchased by Ministerul Armatei and assigned to aerobatic training. It was retired from service in 1940, following an accident.

Specifications (SET XV)

References

Further reading

External links
 Уголок неба
 Aviatia magazine website 

1930s Romanian fighter aircraft
S15